The red-naped ibis (Pseudibis papillosa) also known as the Indian black ibis or black ibis is a species of ibis found in the plains of the Indian Subcontinent. Unlike other ibises in the region it is not very dependent on water and is often found in dry fields a good distance away from water. It is usually seen in loose groups and can be told by the nearly all dark body with a white patch on the shoulder and a bare dark head with a patch of crimson red warty skin on the crown and nape. It has a loud call and is noisy when breeding. It builds its nest most often on the top of a large tree or palm.

Description

The red-naped ibis is a large black bird with long legs and a long downcurved bill. The wing feathers and tail are black with blue-green gloss while the neck and body are brown and without gloss. A white patch on the shoulders stands out and the top of the featherless head is a patch of bright red warty skin. The warty patch, technically a caruncle, is a triangular patch with the apex at the crown and the base of the triangle behind the nape that develops in adult birds. The iris is orange red. Both sexes are identical and young birds are browner and initially lack the bare head and crown. The bills and legs are grey but turn reddish during the breeding season. The toes have a fringing membrane and are slightly webbed at the base.

They are usually silent but call at dawn and dusk and more often when nesting. The calls are a series of loud braying, squealing screams that descend in loudness.

This species can be confused with the glossy ibis when seen at a distance but the glossy ibis is smaller, more gregarious, associated with wetlands and lacks the white on the wing and has a fully feathered head.

Taxonomy  
The species was first given its scientific name by Temminck in 1824. He placed it in the genus Ibis but it was separated into the genus Inocotis created by Reichenbach and this was followed by several major works including the Fauna of British India although the genus Pseudibis in which Hodgson had placed the species had precedence based on the principle of priority. The red-naped ibis (P. papillosa) included the white-shouldered ibis as P. papillosa davisoni, a subspecies, from 1970 but these are now treated as distinct species, although closely related. The main morphological difference between the two species is seen in the crown and the upper neck. While P. papillosa has a patch of red tubercles on the back of the crown, P. davisoni lacks it. Also, adult P. papillosa have a narrow, bright red mid-crown that becomes broader on the hindcrown, whereas, adult P. davisoni has a bare pale blue middle hindcrown that extends to the upper hindneck and forms a complete collar around the upper neck.

Distribution and habitat
The red-naped ibis is widely distributed in the plains of the Indian Subcontinent. The habitats this bird is found at is lakes, marshes, riverbeds and on irrigated farmlands. It is gregarious and generally forages on margins of wetlands in small numbers.  It is a common breeding resident in Haryana and Punjab and the Gangetic plain. It extends into southern India but is not found in the forested regions or the arid zone of the extreme southeast of the peninsula or Sri Lanka.

The red-naped ibis is diurnal in its foraging and other activities, at night roosting communally on trees or on islands.

Food and foraging

The red-naped ibis is omnivorous, feeding on carrion, insects, frogs, and other small vertebrates as well as grain. They forage mainly in dry open land and stubbly fields, sometimes joining egrets and other birds on land being tilled to feed on disturbed insects and exposed beetle grub. They walk and like other tactile-feeding ibises, probe in the soft ground. The rarely wade in water but have been observed seeking out frogs hiding in crab holes. They sometimes feed at garbage dumps. During droughts they are known to feed on carrion and insect larvae feeding on meat. They also feed on groundnut and other crops. In British India, indigo planters considered them useful as they appeared to consume a large number of crickets in the fields.

Ibises roost in groups and fly to and from the regularly used roost site in "V" formation.

Breeding

Red-naped ibises usually nest individually and not in mixed species heronries. They very rarely form small colonies consisting of 3-5 pairs in the same tree. The breeding season is variable but most often between March and October and tending to precede the monsoons. When pair-bonding, females beg for food from the males at foraging grounds. Males also trumpet from the nest site. The nests are mainly large stick platforms that are 35-60 centimetres in diameter and about 10-15 centimetres deep. Old nests are reused as are those of kites and vultures. The nests are loosely lined with straw and fresh material to the nest is added even when the eggs are being incubated. The nests are usually at a height of 6–12 metres above ground, on banyan (Ficus benghalensis) or peepal (Ficus religiosa) trees, often close to human habitation. In recent times they have also taken to nesting on powerline pylons in Gujarat. Pairs copulate mainly when perched on trees. The eggs are 2–4 in number and pale bluish green in colour. They are sparsely flecked and have pale reddish blotches. Both male and female red-naped ibis incubate the eggs which hatch after 33 days.

Parasites 
The nematode Belanisakis ibidis has been identified from the small intestines of the species while the feathers of ibises are host to specific species of bird lice in the genus Ibidoecus. The species found in the red-naped ibis is Ibdidoecus dennelli. Patagifer chandrapuri, a species of Digenea flatworm has been found in the intestines of specimens from Allahabad. In captivity, a trematode Diplostomum ardeiformium has been described from a red-naped ibis host. Protist parasites include Eimeria-like organisms.

In culture 

The Tamil Sangam literature mentions a bird called the "anril" which was described as having a curved bill and calling from atop palmyra palms (Borassus flabellifer). Madhaviah Krishnan identified the bird positively as the black ibis and ruled out contemporary suggestions that this was a sarus crane. Sangam poetry also mentions that the birds mated for life and always walked about in pairs, one of the leading reasons for others to assume that this was the sarus crane, a species that is not found in southern India.

A number of names in Sanskrit literature including "kālakaṇṭak" have been identified as referring to this species. Jerdon noted the local names of "karankal" and "nella kankanam" in Telugu and "buza" or "kālā buza" in Hindi.

In British India, sportsmen referred to the species as the "king curlew", "king ibis" or "black curlew" and it was considered good eating as well as sport for falconers (using the Shaheen falcon). They would race and soar to escape falcons.

Status and conservation 
The species has declined greatly in Pakistan due to hunting and habitat loss. The species has been largely unaffected in India and they are traditionally tolerated by farmers.

The species is considered to be secure in the wild but a few zoos including the ones at Frankfurt, Singapore (Jurong park) have successfully bred the species in captivity. An individual lived in captivity at Berlin zoo for 30 years.

References

External links

 Call recordings
 Media on the Handbook of the Birds of the World website

red-naped ibis
Birds of South Asia
red-naped ibis